The Golden Goblet Award for Best Director (Chinese: 金爵奖最佳导演) is a prize given in the main category of competition at the Shanghai International Film Festival.

Award winners

References

Lists of films by award
Shanghai International Film Festival